The Independent A1E1 is a multi-turreted tank that was designed by the British armaments manufacturer Vickers between the First and Second World Wars. Although it only ever reached the prototype stage and only a single example was built, it influenced many other tank designs.

The A1E1 design can be seen as a possible influence on the Soviet T-100 and T-28 tanks, the German Neubaufahrzeug tanks, and the British Medium Mk III and Cruiser Mk I (triple turret) tank designs. The Soviet T-35 tank was heavily influenced by its design.

Design
The Independent was a multi-turret design, having a central gun turret armed with the 3 pounder (47 mm) gun, and four subsidiary turrets each armed with a 0.303 inch Vickers machine gun. The subsidiary turrets were mounted two at the front and two to the rear of the turret (about halfway along the hull). The gun of the left rear turret was able to elevate to engage aircraft. The tank was designed to have heavy firepower, self-defence capability, and superiority to enemy weapons. It had a crew of eight, the commander communicating with the crew through an intercom system. The Independent was never used in combat, but other armies studied it and a few adopted designs derived from it.

History

Planning for the A1E1 began in December 1922 when the General Staff of the British Army drew up a specification. This was for a turret-less tank with at least  of trench crossing ability. On receiving the specification Vickers began design work on a vehicle that followed the General Staff's ideas and also a multi-turreted design of their own.  The two designs were offered to the General Staff which opted for the Vickers multi-turreted design. An order for a prototype was formally placed on 15 September 1926 but some work appears to have begun before this date.

The tank was largely designed by Walter Gordon Wilson; its  V12 air-cooled engine was designed by Armstrong Siddeley. It also incorporated a new hydraulic braking system which had to be specially developed due to its weight and speed. The prototype was delivered to the War Office in 1926, and displayed to the premiers of the Dominions that year.

In 1928, the rear of the tank was modified to strengthen it. At the same time, a new design of brake-block was fitted.

The tank was the subject of industrial and political espionage, the plans ending up in the Soviet Union, where they may have influenced the design of the T-28 and T-35 tanks. Norman Baillie-Stewart, a British army lieutenant, was court-martialled in 1933 and served five years in prison for providing the plans of the Independent (among other secrets) to a German contact.

It remained in use for experiments until 1935, when it was worn out and retired, now with the Bovington Tank Museum, where it is preserved.

References

Bibliography

External links

 A1E1 Vickers Independent

Interwar tanks of the United Kingdom
Heavy tanks of the United Kingdom
Multi-turreted tanks
Vickers
Abandoned military projects of the United Kingdom
History of the tank
Trial and research tanks of the United Kingdom